, provisional designation , is a sub-kilometer asteroid and near-Earth object of the Amor group, approximately 200 meters in diameter. It was discovered on 27 April 1998 by astronomers of the Spacewatch program at the Kitt Peak National Observatory near Tucson, Arizona, United States.

Description 

 is an Amor asteroid because its perihelion is less than 1.3 AU and does not cross Earth's orbit. It is on a low-eccentricity and low-inclination orbit between the orbits of Earth and Mars. This is within a region of stability where bodies may survive for the age of the Solar System, and hence it may have formed near its current orbit.

The asteroid orbits the Sun at a distance of 1.1–1.3 AU once every 1 year and 4 months (480 days; semi-major axis of 1.20 AU). Its orbit has an eccentricity of 0.11 and an inclination of 4° with respect to the ecliptic. The body's observation arc begins with its official discovery observation at Kitt Peak in April 1998.

Between 1900 and 2200 its closest approach to Earth is more than 0.14 AU.

Numbering and naming 

This minor planet was numbered by the Minor Planet Center on 28 November 2010. As of 2018, it has not been named.

See also

References

External links 
 Asteroid Lightcurve Database (LCDB), query form (info )
 
 
 

251732
251732
251732
19980427